is a Japanese professional footballer who plays as a midfielder for Belgian club  KV Oostende.

Club career
Starting out playing for Toyo University, Sakamoto was a specially designated player for Montedio Yamagata in the 2018 season. Despite not making an appearance during this time, Sakamoto fully joined Montedio Yamagata for the 2019 season playing in the J2 League. Sakamoto appeared in every single league game that Montedio Yamagata played in the 2019 season, scoring seven goals in the process.  The team also advanced into the second round of the promotion playoffs but were beaten 1-0 by Tokushima Vortis.

After a successful debut season in the J2 League, Sakamoto was signed by Cerezo Osaka for the 2020 season. He went on to appear in 33 of their 38 league games and cement himself as part of the team.

On 5 January 2022, Sakamoto joined Belgian club KV Oostende on loan until the end of the season, with an option to buy. This option was triggered later in 25 May, with Oostende signing him in a complete transfer lasting to 2025.

International career
He made his debut for Japan national football team on 7 June 2021 in a World Cup qualifier against Tajikistan.

Club statistics
Updated to 26 May 2022.

References

External links

1996 births
Living people
Japanese footballers
Japan international footballers
Association football midfielders
Montedio Yamagata players
Cerezo Osaka players
K.V. Oostende players
J2 League players
J1 League players
Belgian Pro League players
Japanese expatriate footballers
Expatriate footballers in Belgium
Japanese expatriate sportspeople in Belgium